The Sembakung River is a river of Borneo, in the province of North Kalimantan, Indonesia, about 1600 km northeast of the capital Jakarta.

Geography 
The river flows in the northeastern area of Borneo island with predominantly tropical rainforest climate (designated as Af in the Köppen-Geiger climate classification). The annual average temperature in the area is 24 °C. The warmest month is August, when the average temperature is around 26 °C, and the coldest is January, at 22 °C. The average annual rainfall is 4020 mm. The wettest month is December, with an average of 393 mm rainfall, and the driest is June, with 251 mm rainfall.

See also
List of rivers of Indonesia
List of rivers of Kalimantan

References

Rivers of North Kalimantan
Rivers of Indonesia